The Building Empires Tour was a concert tour by American heavy metal band Queensrÿche in support of their latest album Empire. The setlist consisted of the band performing their album Operation: Mindcrime in full. Suicidal Tendencies and Warrior Soul supported the band throughout North America.

Setlist 

 "Resistance"
 "Walk in the Shadows"
 "Best I Can"
 "Hand on Heart" (Dropped after November 15, 1990)
 "Empire"
 "The Thin Line"
 "Jet City Woman"
 "Another Rainy Night (Without You)" (Starting on October 17, 1991)
 "Roads to Madness"
 "I Remember Now"
 "Anarchy-X"
 "Revolution Calling"
 "Operation: Mindcrime"
 "Speak"
 "Spreading the Disease"
 "The Mission"
 "Suite Sister Mary"
 "The Needle Lies"
 "Electric Requiem"
 "Breaking the Silence"
 "I Don't Believe in Love"
 "Waiting for 22"
 "My Empty Room"
 "Eyes of a Stranger"
 "Della Brown" (Starting on November 8, 1991)
 "Last Time in Paris" (Starting on July 21, 1991)
 "Silent Lucidity"
 "Take Hold of the Flame" (Dropped after July 21, 1991)

Tour Dates

References

1990 concert tours
1991 concert tours
1992 concert tours